Yuri Borisovich Chesnokov (January 22, 1933 – May 30, 2010) was a Russian volleyball player who competed for the Soviet Union in the 1964 Summer Olympics. He was born in Moscow.

Chesnokov was a two-time world champion, having won gold at the 1960 and the 1962 competitions. In 1964 he was part of the Soviet team which won the gold medal in the Olympic tournament. He played eight matches. After his active career, he coached the Soviet team at the 1972 and 1976 Olympics, and later served as a FIVB vice-president for many years. In 2000 he was inducted into the Volleyball Hall of Fame.

References

External links
Profile at sports-reference.com

 

1933 births
2010 deaths
Soviet men's volleyball players
Olympic volleyball players of the Soviet Union
Volleyball players at the 1964 Summer Olympics
Olympic gold medalists for the Soviet Union
Olympic medalists in volleyball
Russian men's volleyball players
Honoured Masters of Sport of the USSR
Merited Coaches of the Soviet Union
Recipients of the Order of Friendship of Peoples
Communist Party of the Soviet Union members
Medalists at the 1964 Summer Olympics